The Windfall Elimination Provision (abbreviated WEP) is a statutory provision in United States law which affects benefits paid by the Social Security Administration under Title II of the Social Security Act.  It reduces the Primary Insurance Amount (PIA) of a person's Retirement Insurance Benefits (RIB) or Disability Insurance Benefits (DIB) when that person is eligible or entitled to a pension based on a job which did not contribute to the Social Security Trust Fund.  While in effect, it also affects the benefits of others claiming on the same social security record.

History 

The Social Security Amendments of 1983 (Public Law 98-21) provided for the WEP as a means of eliminating the "windfall" of social security benefits received by beneficiaries who also receive a pension based on work not covered by Social Security.  The windfall in question refers to the subsidization of the PIA for beneficiaries with lower incomes throughout life.  Prior to the institution of the WEP, beneficiaries who paid little into social security but were paid well outside of the system were given this subsidy.

Applicability 

The WEP is applied to certain beneficiaries who are receiving RIB or DIB and who also:
The beneficiary becomes entitled to the benefits after 1985
The beneficiary also first becomes eligible, after 1985, for a pension based in any way upon earnings from employment that was not covered by social security
The beneficiary's entitlement to this pension has not yet ended (even if not yet claimed)
The beneficiary is still alive
The beneficiary has not obtained 30 Years of Coverage (YOCs) at the age of 62 years.

Computation 

There are two ways in which to compute the WEP affected PIA: the Modified New Start 1978 Method and the Modified Old Start 1977 Method.  Special rules apply to deciding which method to use or if to use different guaranteed PIAs.

Modified New Start 1978 Method 

The following steps are taken in determining the WEP PIA with the Modified New Start 1978 Method: (See Primary Insurance Amount for clarification)

1. Calculate the Average Indexed Monthly Earnings (AIME).

2. Choose the percentage of the first bend-point to be the higher of the percentage based on the eligibility year or the percentage based on the YOCs acquired.

3. Calculate the PIA based on this, rounding down to the nearest dime.

4. Calculate the PIA normally and reduce by 50% of the amount of the non-covered pension's monthly payment.

5. Select the higher value given by steps 3 and 4.

Bend-point based on eligibility year 

The effects of the WEP were phased in between 1986 and 1990.  When calculating based on the year of eligibility, the year in which the beneficiary was eligible for both a Title II Social Security Benefit and the non-covered pension.  The following chart shows the percentages applied before the first bend-point based on the first year the beneficiary was eligible for both:

1986| 80%
1987| 70%
1988| 60%
1989| 50%
1990 or later| 40%

Bend-point based on YOCs acquired 

When calculating based on YOCs acquired, the following chart shows what percentage to apply before the first bend-point:

YOCS | Percentage
30 + | 90% (full)
29 | 85%
28 | 80%
27 | 75%
26 | 70%
25 | 65%
24 | 60%
23 | 55%
22 | 50%
21 | 45%
20 - | 40%

Modified Old Start 1977 Method 

The following steps are taken in determining the WEP PIA with the Modified Old Start 1977 Method: (See Primary Insurance Amount for clarification)

1. Compute the raw 1977 Simplified Old Start PIA.

2. Reduce the PIA to 50% and round down to the nearest dime.

3. Reduce the PIA from step 1 by 50% of the non-covered pension amount.

4. Select the larger of the PIA from steps 2 and 3.

Special Minimum PIA 

The Special Minimum PIA, intended to assist individuals with low earnings over their working life, has been in effect on all benefits payable since January 1973.  Since January 1979, it is calculated by subtracting 10 from the number of YOCs and multiplying that result by $11.50.  That result is then adjusted for the cost of living, approximately equivalent to multiplying by $34.20 instead of $11.50 for 2008.

DIB Guarantee PIA 

The 1977 amendments to the Social Security Act allowed for a DIB Guarantee PIA.  Under these provisions, a future PIA used for any benefits after 1978 can be no smaller than:

The PIA in the last month of entitlement to DIB which terminated more than 12 months prior to entitlement to RIB, reentitlement to DIB, or death
The PIA in the last month of entitlement to DIB, adjusted for any intervening cost of living increases, if it terminated within 12 months of entitlement to RIB, reentitlement to DIB, or death
The PIA in the last month of entitlement to RIB, adjusted for any intervening cost of living increases, of a deceased beneficiary, if the beneficiary was converted from DIB to RIB at Full Retirement Age

Not all DIB Guaranteed PIAs are adjusted for the cost of living.

Applying the PIAs 

The highest of these four PIA amounts is used on the record.  The WEP PIA will affect not only the benefits of the primary beneficiary on the record, but also that of any auxiliaries receiving benefits on the record.  However, the WEP does not apply once the primary beneficiary has died, and survivor benefits are unaffected.  Whereas Widow's and Widower's Benefits take into account the amount of benefits the primary beneficiary may have received while living, a fictitious amount is created as if WEP did not apply for this purpose.

Effects on benefits 

When the WEP applies, it is used in determining all benefits on the record, both for the primary beneficiary and any auxiliaries.  This includes an effect upon the maximum total benefits paid on the record as well.  The WEP does apply after the death of the primary beneficiary, and can have devastating effects for survivors.

Notes

Sources 

Social Security Program Operations Manual System. Social Security Administration.  https://s044a90.ssa.gov/apps10/poms.nsf/partlist!OpenView.

See also 

 Retirement Insurance Benefits
 Disability Insurance Benefits

External links 
 Official website of the Social Security Administration
 Online WEP Calculator
 Details of the 1983 Amendments

Social security in the United States